Sardis is an unincorporated community and census-designated place (CDP) in southeast Saline County, Arkansas, United States. It is part of the Little Rock-North Little Rock-AR  Metropolitan Statistical Area. It was first listed as a CDP in the 2020 census with a population of 833.

The community is approximately six miles east-southeast of Bauxite and four miles southwest of East End. Hurricane Creek flows past approximately one mile west of the site.

Sardis is part of the Bryant Public School District.

Demographics

2020 census

Note: the US Census treats Hispanic/Latino as an ethnic category. This table excludes Latinos from the racial categories and assigns them to a separate category. Hispanics/Latinos can be of any race.

References

Unincorporated communities in Arkansas
Census-designated places in Arkansas
Census-designated places in Saline County, Arkansas